Zhang Yanqing (born October 14, 1978) is a female Chinese softball player. She competed in the 2000 Summer Olympics.

In the 2000 Olympic softball competition, she finished fourth with the Chinese team. She played seven matches as pitcher.

External links
 
 
 
 

1978 births
Living people
Chinese softball players
Olympic softball players of China
Softball players at the 2000 Summer Olympics
Asian Games medalists in softball
Asian Games gold medalists for China
Asian Games silver medalists for China
Softball players at the 1998 Asian Games
Softball players at the 2002 Asian Games
Medalists at the 1998 Asian Games
Medalists at the 2002 Asian Games